Edealina is a municipality in central-south Goiás state, Brazil.

Location
Edealina has municipal boundaries with Edéia, Pontalina, Indiara, and Cezarina  The important Rio dos Bois forms part of the municipal boundary.

Highway communications with Goiânia are made by BR-060 / Guapó / Cezarina / Indiara / GO-320 / Edéia / GO-215. Sepin

Political Data
Eligible voters: 3,162 (12/2007)
Mayor (prefeito): Vantuir Alves de Oliveira (2005)
Vice-mayor (vice-prefeito): 
Councilmembers (vereadores): 09

Demographic Data
Population density: 6.16 inhabitants/km2 (2007)
Population growth rate 2000/2007: -0.32.%
Population in 1991: 4,039 
Urban population: 2,557  (2007)
Rural population: 1,161  (2007)

Economy
The economy is based on soybeans, corn, rice, beans, tomatoes and on cattle raising.  In some areas pivot sprinklers are being used.  In the industrial sector there is a dairy, and several brickworks.

Economic Data
Industrial units: 05 ( 06/2007)
Retail units: 35 (08/2007)
Banking institutions: none (2007)
Dairies: Coop. M. dos Prod. de Leite de Morrinhos Ltda. (22/05/2006)
Cattle: 56,350 (2006)
Modest production of cotton—rice (700 hectares)
Corn: 3,900 hectares (2006)
Soybeans: 13,500 hectares planted 
Motor vehicles: 374 automobiles in 2007

Agricultural Data for 2006
Number of farms: 410
Total area: 56,584
Planted area: 11,600
Area of natural pasture: 33,025
Workers in agriculture: 1,300

Education and Health
Literacy rate: 83.5% (2000)
Infant mortality rate: 12.88 in 1,000 live births (2000)
Schools: 03 with 1,055 students in 2006
Hospitals: 0
Public health clinics (SUS): 04

Ranking on the Municipal Human Development Index
MHDI:  0.768
State ranking:  43 (out of 242 municipalities in 2000)
National ranking:  1,393 (out of 5,507 municipalities in 2000)

For the complete list see Frigoletto.com

History
Edealina was first created as a district in 1976 in the municipality of Edéia.  In 1988 it was dismembered from Edéia and made a municipality.  The origin of the name is unknown.

See also
List of municipalities in Goiás
Microregions of Goiás

References

Frigoletto

Municipalities in Goiás